Dame Pamela Jean Shaw  is a British consultant neurologist, and professor of neurology at the University of Sheffield. She is the founder and director of the Sheffield Institute for Translational Neuroscience (SITraN), and in 2019 was appointed to lead the National Institute for Health Research (NIHR) Sheffield Biomedical Research Centre.

Education
In 1979 Shaw graduated with first class honours in medicine from the University of Newcastle and was awarded several prizes during her undergraduate degree. She subsequently undertook further training in neurology at Newcastle, worked towards the award of Membership of the Royal Colleges of Physicians of the United Kingdom and was awarded an MD degree in 1988. Her doctoral work was on the neurological and neuropsychological complications of coronary bypass surgery.

Research and career
She specialises in the "molecular mechanisms of neurodegeneration and neuroprotection in disorders of the motor system (motor neurone disease and HSP)".

Since 1991, long term funding from the Wellcome Trust has supported her research group to study the source of neurodegenerative disorders of the human motor system. They have been able to implicate various subcellular pathways and cellular features in susceptibility. In addition, they have screened candidates for potential in treatment for these disorders. This work contributed to evidence underpinning the use of riluzole in motor neurone disease.

In 1997 she was appointed Professor of Neurological Medicine at the University of Newcastle and in 2000 she moved to the University of Sheffield as Professor of Neurology. She developed training and research in clinical neuroscience at Sheffield, building on the excellent clinical expertise in the department.

Shaw has been chair of the Clinical Research and Academic Committee of the Association of British Neurologists.

Awards
Shaw held a Wellcome Senior Fellowship in Clinical Science from 1991 - 2000 and she is currently a Senior Investigator at the NIHR.

In 2014, she was made a Dame Commander of the Order of the British Empire.

In 2019 she was awarded the GL Brown prize lecture by the Physiological Society.

References

Year of birth missing (living people)
Place of birth missing (living people)
Living people
Dames Commander of the Order of the British Empire
Fellows of the Academy of Medical Sciences (United Kingdom)
Academics of the University of Sheffield
British neurologists
Women neurologists
NIHR Senior Investigators